The 1953–54 Serie A season was won by Internazionale.

Teams
Genoa and Legnano had been promoted from Serie B.

Final classification

Results

Relegation tie-breaker
Played in Milan, Florence and Rome

Palermo relegated to Serie B.

Top goalscorers

References and sources
Almanacco Illustrato del Calcio - La Storia 1898-2004, Panini Edizioni, Modena, September 2005

External links
  - All results on RSSSF Website.

Serie A seasons
Italy
1953–54 in Italian football leagues